Sakar Island is a volcanic island north-west of New Britain in the Bismarck Sea, at . It is a stratovolcano with a summit crater lake. No recorded eruptions are known.

See also
 List of volcanoes in Papua New Guinea

References 
 

Islands of Papua New Guinea
Stratovolcanoes of Papua New Guinea
Volcanic crater lakes
Morobe Province